This is a list of  Time Team  episodes from series 8.

Episode

Series 8

Episode # refers to the air date order. The Time Team Specials are aired in between regular episodes, but are omitted from this list. Regular contributors on Time Team include: Tony Robinson (presenter); archaeologists Mick Aston, Phil Harding, Carenza Lewis, Neil Holbrook, Jenni Butterworth, Mick Worthington, Katie Hirst, Francis Pryor; Robin Bush, Guy de la Bedoyere (historians); Margaret Cox (osteoarchaeologist); Victor Ambrus (illustrator); Stewart Ainsworth (landscape investigator); John Gater (geophysicist); Henry Chapman (surveyor); Paul Blinkhorn (pottery expert); Mark Corney (Roman buildings expert); Raysan Al-Kubaisi (computer graphics).

References

External links
Time Team at Channel4.com
The Unofficial Time Team site Fan site

Time Team (Series 08)
2001 British television seasons